Ribosome recycling factor or ribosome release factor (RRF) is a protein found in bacterial cells as well as eukaryotic organelles, specifically mitochondria and chloroplasts. It functions to recycle ribosomes after completion of protein synthesis (bacterial translation). In humans, the mitochrondrial version is coded by the MRRF gene.

Discovery 
The ribosome recycling factor was discovered in the early 1970s by the work of Akira Kaji and Akikazu Hiroshima at the University of Pennsylvania.  Their work described the requirement for two protein factors to release ribosomes from mRNA. These two factors were identified as RRF, an unknown protein until then, and Elongation Factor G (EF-G), a protein already identified and known to function in protein synthesis. RRF was originally called Ribosome Releasing Factor but is now called Ribosome Recycling Factor.

Function 
RRF accomplishes the recycling of ribosomes by splitting ribosomes into subunits, thereby releasing the bound mRNA. This also requires the participation of EF-G (GFM2 in humans). Depending on the tRNA, IF1–IF3 may also perform recycling.

Loss of RRF function
In Bacteria (specifically Escherichia coli), loss of the gene encoding RRF is deleterious. This makes RRF a possible target for new antibacterial drugs.
Yeast mitochondrial RRF (mtRRF) is encoded by a gene in the cell nucleus. Loss of function of this gene leads to mitochondrial genome instability and respiratory incompetence.

Structure and binding to ribosomes 
The crystal structure of RRF was first determined by X-ray diffraction in 1999. The most striking revelation was that RRF is a near-perfect structural mimic of tRNA, in both size and dimensions. One view of RRF can be seen here.

Despite the tRNA-mimicry, RRF binds to ribosomes quite differently from the way tRNA does. It has been suggested that ribosomes bind proteins (or protein domain) of similar shape and size to tRNA, and this, rather than function, explains the observed structural mimicry.

See also 
Ribosome
Translation (genetics)
Eukaryotic release factors

References

External links
 

Proteins